Mount Craig is in Kluane National Park and Reserve in Yukon Territory, Canada.

References

Craiga
Craig